Nizhegorodskaya is a Moscow Railway station of the Gorkovsky suburban railway line in Moscow, Russia. It was opened in 1932 and rebuilt in 2018. It was formerly known as Karacharovo (.

Gallery

References

Railway stations in Moscow
Railway stations of Moscow Railway
Railway stations in Russia opened in 1932